The 43rd British Columbia general election will be held on or before October 19, 2024, to elect members of the Legislative Assembly to serve in the 43rd parliament of the Canadian province of British Columbia.

Background
Section 23 of British Columbia's Constitution Act provides that general elections occur on the third Saturday in October of the fourth calendar year after the last election. The same section, though, makes the fixed election date subject to the lieutenant governor's prerogative to dissolve the Legislative Assembly as they see fit (in practice, on the advice of the province's premier or following a vote of non-confidence).

The Electoral Boundaries Commission is required to complete redistricting following the 2020 general election. The government appointed commissioners in October 2021.  Their preliminary report must be completed by October 21, 2022. The final number of provincial electoral districts, and thus seats in the next legislature, will not be known until their final report is released about six months later.

Standings

Timeline

2020 
 October 24: The 2020 British Columbia general election is held, resulting in a majority government for the BC NDP. 
 November 21: Andrew Wilkinson steps aside for an interim leader to be selected for the BC Liberal Party.
 November 23: Shirley Bond is selected as interim leader of the BC Liberal party.

2021 

 February 17: Wilkinson officially resigns, triggering a year-long leadership race.

2022 

 February 5: Kevin Falcon wins the 2022 British Columbia Liberal Party leadership election.
 February 7: Andrew Wilkinson resigns as MLA for Vancouver-Quilchena.
 April 30: BC Liberal Party leader Kevin Falcon returns to the Legislature after winning the by-election in Vancouver-Quilchena. Liberal MLA Stephanie Cadieux resigns as MLA for Surrey South to become Canada's first chief accessibility officer.
 June 28: John Horgan announces his intention to step down as premier and as leader of the NDP.
 August 18: Liberal MLA for Nechako Lakes John Rustad is removed from the Liberal caucus for suggesting online that carbon dioxide emissions do not cause climate change.
 September 10: Liberal Elenore Sturko is elected MLA for Surrey South in a by-election.
 October 21: David Eby is declared leader of the BC NDP in the 2022 leadership election by acclamation and becomes the premier-designate.
 November 16: BC Liberal members approve the party's name change to "BC United".
 November 18: Eby is sworn in as premier of British Columbia.

2023 
 February 16: John Rustad crosses the floor to sit as a Conservative, becoming the party's only MLA.
 February 22: Melanie Mark announces her resignation as cabinet minister and as MLA for Vancouver-Mount Pleasant.
 May 28: 2023 Conservative Party of British Columbia leadership election will be held to replace outgoing leader Trevor Bolin.

Opinion polls

Notes

References

Opinion poll sources

External links
Elections BC

2024
British Columbia general election, 2024